Lucy Warburton may refer to:

Lucy Warburton, character in The Leftovers (TV series)
Lucy Warburton (tennis), played in 2008 Nordea Danish Open – Singles